James A. Roberts (29 April 1922 – 28 June 2019) was an English architect, best known for the Rotunda in Birmingham, from which he ran James A. Roberts Associates.

His grandson is the acclaimed British Indian actor of Sikh profession Jassa Singh Ahluwalia.

Roberts was born in Kings Heath, Birmingham. He was the son of Ernest S. Roberts (d.1945), a Birmingham-based architect responsible for many cinema designs. James Roberts was educated at Stanley House School, Edgbaston, later studying at the Birmingham School of Architecture where he became a senior lecturer. He set up on his own account in Edgbaston in 1952 and eventually had a large practice in the Rotunda, a grade II listed cylindrical office building, that was designed by him, located in the city centre of Birmingham. He himself took the top two floors of the building. Like many similar concerns James A. Roberts Associates suffered from the building recessions of the 1970s  though in a reduced form, it was able to continue up to 1981.

He was also responsible for other structures in Birmingham's postwar regeneration including: The Ringway Centre and the former Albany Hotel. Projects include The Belfry Hotel and Golf Centre, in Warwickshire, spiritual home of the Ryder Cup; Solihull Library and Police Station; St John's Beacon, (now known as the Radio City Building) Liverpool, known for its revolving restaurant at the top; and the Mander Shopping Centre (1968), in Wolverhampton city centre, home to the iconic Dame Barbara Hepworth sculpture, "Rock Form".

He was a member of the Civic Trust Association and was responsible for the conservation and restoration of notable old buildings resulting in him receiving several Civic Trust Awards, notably for restoration of the 16th-century manor house, Madeley Court, Telford, into a prestigious hotel, and West Bromwich Manor House, which is an important, Grade I listed, medieval domestic building built in the late 13th century by the de Marnham family, latterly a hotel and public house in the 1960s post restoration, and now belongs to the Sandwell Borough Museums Trust and used as a historical education site for schools and other community groups.

Roberts later lived in Lymington, Hampshire.

References 

1922 births
2019 deaths
20th-century English architects
Architects from Birmingham, West Midlands